() means child in Sanskrit.

Putra may also refer to:

Places
Putrajaya, the federal administrative centre of Malaysia
the Putra Bridge
Putra Mosque
Putra Heights, a township in Selangor
Putra Indoor Stadium, at Malaysian National Sports Complex
Putra Komuter station
Putra World Trade Centre, in Kuala Lumpur
Projek Usahasama Transit Ringan Automatik (PUTRA) light rail transit, now called the Kelana Jaya Line
Terminal Putra LRT station
Universiti Putra Malaysia, a top research university in Malaysia

Other uses
Putra (name), including a list of people with the name
Proton Putra, a Malaysian car brand
Wisma Putra, another name for the Malaysian Ministry of Foreign Affairs
Putra Post, a Malaysian tabloid newspaper
Parti Bumiputera Perkasa Malaysia (PUTRA), a Malaysian nationalist political party